Agrupación Deportiva Casar de Cáceres is a Spanish football team based in Casar de Cáceres, in the autonomous community of Extremadura. Founded in 2003, it plays in Regional Preferente, holding home games at Estadio Municipal de Casar de Cáceres.

Season to season

3 seasons in Primera Regional
2 seasons in Regional Preferente

References

External links
Futbolme.com profile
fexfutbol.com profile

Football clubs in Extremadura
Divisiones Regionales de Fútbol clubs
Association football clubs established in 2003
2003 establishments in Spain